Secondary may refer to:

Science and nature 
 Secondary emission, of particles
 Secondary electrons, electrons generated as ionization products
 The secondary winding, or the electrical or electronic circuit connected to the secondary winding in a transformer
 Secondary (chemistry), a term used in organic chemistry to classify various types of compounds
 Secondary color, color made from mixing primary colors
 Secondary mirror, second mirror element/focusing surface in a reflecting telescope
 Secondary craters, often called "secondaries"
 Secondary consumer, in ecology
 An antiquated name for the Mesozoic in geosciences
 Secondary feathers, flight feathers attached to the ulna on the wings of birds

Society and culture 
 Secondary (football), a position in American football and Canadian football
 Secondary dominant in music
 Secondary education, education which typically takes place after six years of primary education 
 Secondary school, the type of school at the secondary level of education
 Secondary market, an aftermarket where financial assets are traded

See also
 
 
 Second (disambiguation)
 Binary (disambiguation)
 Primary (disambiguation)
 Tertiary (disambiguation)